The 2015 World Series by Renault was the 11th season of Renault Sport's series of events, with three different championships racing under one banner. Consisting of the Formula Renault 3.5 Series, Eurocup Formula Renault 2.0 and Renault Sport Trophy, the World Series by Renault ran at seven different venues where fans could get into the meetings for no cost whatsoever, such is the uniqueness of the series. It was the first season with Renault Sport Trophy.

The series began on 25 April at the Ciudad del Motor de Aragón in Alcañiz, and finished on 18 October at the Circuito de Jerez, just outside Jerez de la Frontera. Round at Silverstone Circuit replaced Moscow Raceway round. Rounds at Circuit Paul Ricard was dropped.

Race calendar
 Event in light blue is not part of the World Series, but is a championship round for the Formula Renault 3.5 Series.

Championships

Formula Renault 3.5 Series

Eurocup Formula Renault 2.0

Renault Sport Trophy

Endurance

Elite

Prestige

References

 Linked articles contain additional references.

External links
 Official website of the World Series by Renault

Renault Sport Series seasons